Kamloops This Week is a local newspaper in Kamloops, British Columbia, founded in 1988. The newspaper has won numerous awards. 

Published Wednesdays only due to COVID-19.

See also
List of newspapers in Canada

References

External links
Kamloops This Week – Official website.

Mass media in Kamloops
Publications established in 1988
1988 establishments in British Columbia
Weekly newspapers published in British Columbia